Cycas is a genus of cycad. It is the only genus in the family Cycadaceae. About 113 species are accepted, which are native to the Asia-Pacific, East Africa and Madagascar. Cycas circinalis, a species endemic to India, was the first cycad species to be described in western literature, and is the type species of the genus. The best-known Cycas species is Cycas revoluta.

Range

The genus is native to the Old World, with the species concentrated around the equatorial regions - eastern and southeastern Asia including the Philippines with 10 species (9 of which are endemic), eastern Africa (including Madagascar), northern Australia, Polynesia, and Micronesia. Australia has 26 species, while the Indo-Chinese area has about 30. India has 9 species. The northernmost species (C. revoluta) is found at 31°N in southern Japan. The southernmost (C. megacarpa) is found at 26°S in southeast Queensland. Due to the occurrence of large number of Cycas species in China, Australia and India, those countries are considered as centres of Cycas diversity.

Evolution

Cycas is though to have split from all other living cycads at least 200 million years ago, possibly much earlier. Fossil seeds from the Middle Jurassic of England and British Columbia, were suggested in a 2017 study to be more closely related to Cycas than other cycads, were assigned to the same family, Cycadaceae. However, a later study suggested that these seeds could not be assigned to the stem-group of Cycas with confidence due to lacking the double vascular system that characterises the seeds of all living cycads. The earliest fossils assignable to Cycas are known from the Paleogene of East Asia, such as Cycas fushunensis from the Eocene of Northeast China, with East Asia likely representing the ancestral homeland of the genus.

Morphology 

The plants are dioecious, and the family Cycadaceae is unique among the cycads in not forming seed cones on female plants, but rather a group of leaf-like structures called megasporophylls each with seeds on the lower margins, and pollen cones or strobilus on male individuals.

The caudex is cylindrical, surrounded by the persistent petiole bases. Most species form distinct branched or unbranched trunks but in some species the main trunk can be subterranean with the leaf crown appearing to arise directly from the ground. There are two types of leaves - foliage leaves and scaly leaves. The foliage leaves are pinnate (or more rarely bipinnate) and arranged spirally, with thick and hard keratinose. They are not permanent and fall off leaving back leaf-bases. The leaflets are articulated, have midrib but lack secondary veins. The scaly leaves are persistent, brown in colour and protective in function. Megasporophylls are not gathered in cones. Pollination takes place by air.

Reproduction

The plant takes several years to grow, sexual reproduction takes place after 10 years of exclusive vegetative growth which occurs by bulbils arising at the base of the trunk.

Conservation status
Cycas species are threatened worldwide and almost all the species are listed in IUCN Redlist. Cycas beddomei is the only species of the genus Cycas listed in Appendix I of CITES. Cycas rumphii and Cycas pectinata have the most widespread distribution

List of species

Cycas aculeata
Cycas aenigma
Cycas angulata
Cycas annaikalensis
Cycas apoa
Cycas arenicola
Cycas armstrongii
Cycas arnhemica
Cycas badensis
Cycas balansae
Cycas basaltica
Cycas beddomei
Cycas bifida
Cycas bougainvilleana
Cycas brachycantha
Cycas brunnea
Cycas cairnsiana
Cycas calcicola
Cycas campestris
Cycas canalis
Cycas candida
Cycas cantafolia
Cycas chamaoensis
Cycas changjiangensis
Cycas chenii
Cycas chevalieri
Cycas circinalis
Cycas clivicola
Cycas collina
Cycas condaoensis
Cycas conferta
Cycas couttsiana
Cycas cupida
Cycas curranii
Cycas debaoensis
Cycas desolata
Cycas diannanensis
Cycas distans P.I.Forst. & B.Gray
Cycas dolichophylla
Cycas edentata
Cycas elephantipes
Cycas elongata
Cycas falcata
Cycas fairylakea
Cycas ferruginea
Cycas fugax
Cycas furfuracea
Cycas glauca
Cycas guizhouensis
Cycas hainanensis
Cycas hoabinhensis
Cycas hongheensis
Cycas indica (=Cycas swamyi)
Cycas inermis
Cycas javana
Cycas lacrimans
Cycas lane-poolei
Cycas lindstromii
Cycas litoralis
Cycas maconochiei
Cycas macrocarpa
Cycas media
Cycas megacarpa
Cycas micholitzii
Cycas micronesica
Cycas montana
Cycas multipinnata
Cycas nathorstii
Cycas nayagarhensis
Cycas nitida
Cycas nongnoochiae
Cycas ophiolitica
Cycas orientis
Cycas orixensis
Cycas pachypoda
Cycas panzhihuaensis
Cycas papuana
Cycas pectinata
Cycas petraea
Cycas platyphylla
Cycas pranburiensis
Cycas pruinosa
Cycas revoluta (Sago palm)
Cycas riuminiana
Cycas rumphii  Miq.
Cycas sancti-lasallei
Cycas sainathii
Cycas saxatilis
Cycas schumanniana
Cycas scratchleyana
Cycas seemannii A.Braun
Cycas segmentifida
Cycas semota
Cycas sexseminifera
Cycas shanyaensis
Cycas siamensis
Cycas silvestris
Cycas simplicipinna
Cycas sphaerica
Cycas sundaica
Cycas szechuanensis
Cycas taitungensis
Cycas taiwaniana
Cycas tanqingii
Cycas tansachana
Cycas thouarsii
Cycas tropophylla
Cycas tuckeri
Cycas vespertilio
Cycas wadei
Cycas xipholepis
Cycas yorkiana
Cycas yunnanensis
Cycas zambalensis
Cycas zeylanica

References

External links

Hill, K.D.(1998–2004) The Cycad Pages, Royal Botanic Gardens Sydney. http://plantnet.rbgsyd.nsw.gov.au/PlantNet/cycad/index.html 
Virtual Cycad Encyclopedia edited by the Palm & Cycad Societies of Florida
David, J. de Laubenfels, Cycas Taxonomy

Singh, R & JS Khuraijam (2013-) Cycads of India. http://www.cycadsofindia.in/

{{cite journal | last1 = Singh | first1 = R. | last2 = Radha | first2 = P. | year = 2006 | title = Cycas annaikalensis, A new species of Cycas from the Malabar Coast, Western Ghats, India | journal = Brittonia | volume = 58 | issue = 2| pages = 119–123 | doi=10.1663/0007-196x(2006)58[119:ansocf]2.0.co;2| s2cid = 32241023 }}
Terrence Walters & Roy Osborne (eds.) (2004), Cycad Classification: Concepts and Recommendations'', CABI publishing,